Clervaux (or (locally)) is a commune and town in northern Luxembourg, administrative capital of the canton of Clervaux.

The town's arms, granted in 1896, show three blackbirds on a gold ground in the chief of a red shield, as a variation of the arms of the former Lords of Clervaux.

, the town of Clervaux, which lies in the southwest of the commune, has a population of 1,309.

Populated places
The commune consists of the following villages:

 Clervaux Section:
 Clervaux
 Eselborn (Eeselbur)
 Mecher (Mecher)
 Reuler (Reiler)
 Urspelt (Ischpelt)
 Weicherdange (Wäicherdang)
 Kaaspelterhof (Kaaspelt) (lieu-dit)
 Kirelshof (Kirelshaff) (lieu-dit)
 Wirtgensmühle (Wirtgensmillen) (lieu-dit)

 Heinerscheid Section:
 Fischbach (Fëschbech)
 Grindhausen (Grandsen)
 Heinerscheid (Hengescht)
 Hupperdange (Hëpperdang)
 Kalborn (Kaalber)
 Lieler (Léiler)
 Fossenhof (Fossenhaff) (lieu-dit)
 Kaesfurt (Kéisfuert) (lieu-dit)
 Kalborn-Moulin (Kaalber Millen) (lieu-dit)
 Lausdorn* (Lausduer) (lieu-dit)
 Tintesmühle (Tëntesmillen) (lieu-dit)

 Munshausen Section:
 Drauffelt (Draufelt)
 Marnach (Maarnech)
 Munshausen (Munzen)
 Roder (Rueder)
 Siebenaler (Siwwenaler)

Note:
* - partially shared with the Commune of Wäisswampech

History
The city was the site of heavy fighting during World War II, in the December 1944 Battle of Clervaux, part of the "Battle of the Bulge".

Population

Sights

The Family of Man, a famous exhibit of photos collected by Edward Steichen, is on permanent display in Clervaux Castle.

The castle also includes the Battle of the Bulge Museum, with an extensive collection of American, German, and Luxembourgish artifacts from World War II, and an exhibition of models of the castles and palaces of Luxembourg.  A U.S. Sherman tank that participated in the battle for Clervaux and a German 88 anti-aircraft/anti-tank artillery piece are on display in front of the castle.

The Abbey of St. Maurice and St. Maur is situated on the hills above the town of Clervaux. Notable associations include Halldór Laxness, 1902–1998, the Nobel Prize-winning Icelandic writer, who converted to Roman Catholicism while staying at the abbey. A Roman Catholic mission to Scandinavia has for many years maintained a base at the abbey.

The town is also home to a parish church, built between 1910 and 1912 in the Rheinisch-Romanesque style, and to an eighteenth-century chapel.

Twin towns — sister cities

Clervaux is twinned with:
 Horezu, Romania

Gallery

References

External links
 
 
 

 
Communes in Clervaux (canton)
Towns in Luxembourg